Leathernose (French: Nez de cuir, Italian: Naso di cuoio) is a 1952 French-Italian historical drama film directed by Yves Allégret and starring Jean Marais, Françoise Christophe and Mariella Lotti. It is an adaptation of the 1936 novel by Jean de La Varende, set in France in the years after the Napoleonic Wars. It was shot at the Joinville Studios. The film's sets were designed by the art director Georges Wakhévitch.

Main cast
 Jean Marais as Roger de Tainchebraye 
 Françoise Christophe as Judith de Rieusses 
 Jean Debucourt as Le marquis de Brives 
 Mariella Lotti as Hélène Josias 
 Massimo Girotti as Le docteur Marchal 
 Yvonne de Bray as Marie-Bonne 
 Valentine Tessier as Simone de Tainchebraye 
 Marcel André as Josias
 Denis d'Inès as Le duc de Laval 
 Françoise Prévost as Une jeune invitée
 Giani Esposito as Un jeune invité
 Yolande Laffon as Madame de Brigade - une vieille dame
 Madeleine Lambert as Une invitée 
 Yves Massard as Un gentilhomme

References

Bibliography
 Hayward, Susan. French Costume Drama of the 1950s: Fashioning Politics in Film. Intellect Books, 2010.

External links
 

1952 films
1950s Italian-language films
Films scored by Georges Auric
Films directed by Yves Allégret
Films based on French novels
Italian historical films
French historical films
1950s historical films
Films set in the 19th century
Pathé films
French black-and-white films
Italian black-and-white films
1950s Italian films
1950s French films
Films shot at Joinville Studios